The Flour Bridge is a bridge across the Griboyedov Canal in Saint Petersburg, Russia. 

The bridge got its name from the flour warehouses located nearby, which were built in the 18th century and also gave their name to the nearby Flour Alley.

The first bridge at this place was built in 1931, it had three spans and carried heating pipes. In 1951 the bridge was rebuilt according to P. V. Bazhenov's design which converted it into a single span pedestrian bridge. 

The arch of the bridge is created by a curvilinear steel beam which is supported by the quay walls. Gently sloping stairways descend at the ends of the bridge.

References 

Bridges in Saint Petersburg
Bridges completed in 1931
Bridges completed in 1951